Qianxi is a county-level city of western Guizhou province, People's Republic of China. It is under the administration of Bijie City. The county had a population of 970,700 in 2019.

The area of Qianxi has been inhabited since prehistoric times, as evidenced by stone tools found in the Guanyin cave among others.

Qianxi is also the home of Guizhou opera (Qianju).

Geography and climate
Qianxi ranges in latitude from 26° 45' to 27° 21' N and in longitude from 105° 47' to 106° 26' E, and straddles the middle reaches of the Wu River. It borders Xiuwen County to the east, Qingzhen and Zhijin County to the south, Dafang County to the west, north and northeast, and Jinsha County to the north.

Due to its low latitude and elevation above , Qianxi has a monsoon-influenced humid subtropical climate (Köppen Cwa), with hot, humid summers (though devoid of extreme heat) and cool, damp winters. Rainfall is extremely common year-round, occurring on 187 days of the year (i.e. slightly more than half of the days), but over half of the annual total occurs from June to August.

References

 
County-level divisions of Guizhou
Bijie